Mlomp is a locality in Oussouye Department, Casamance, Senegal.

Mlomp can also refer to:

Mlomp, Bignona, a locality in Bignona Department, Casamance, Senegal
The Mlomp language, a language mostly spoken in Mlomp, Bignona